Contra el Viento ("Against the Wind") is the sixth studio album by singer-songwriter Kany García. The album was released on May 17, 2019. The album earned 2,000 album-equivalent units in the week ending May 23. The album was included in Billboard magazine's "The 50 Best Albums of 2019 (So Far)" list.

Composition and production
Each track of Contra el Viento is preceded by a short, spoken-word intro. These commentaries were recorded by a range of women García identifies with, including Mercedes Sosa, Natti Natasha, Lila Downs, and Sofía Vergara. According to Billboard, the commentaries serve "as the framework for a deep dive into the full range of a personal evolution, going from loss and disillusionment to self-awareness, rebirth and finally, love again".

The album was produced by Marcos Sánchez and recorded by Orlando Di Pietro, Larry Coll, José E. Diaz, Orlando Ferrer, Harold W. Sanders, Ismar Colón and Daniel Bitran Arizpe.

Track listing

Charts

Awards and nominations

References

External links
 

2019 albums
Kany García albums
Sony Music Latin albums
Latin Grammy Award for Best Singer-Songwriter Album